Michael Voysey (1920 in Grimsby − 1987 in Colchester) was a playwright and writer for TV programmes.

As a playwright he created My Astonishing Self from the works of George Bernard Shaw. He also wrote The Amorous Goldfish and adapted Marguerite by Armand Salacrou

Works
As a TV writer he has written the following:
Father Brown (1974) TV Series (adaptation)
Cheri (1973) (TV)
Cranford (1972) (TV)
Wives and Daughters (1971) (mini) TV Series (adaptation)
Imperial Palace (1969) (TV)
Middlemarch (1968) (mini) TV Series (adaptation)
A Place of One's Own, an episode of Mystery and Imagination (1968)
The White Rabbit (1967) – a TV series adapted by Voysey from the novels by Bruce Marshall
The Woman in White (1966) TV Series (writer)
Mr. John Jorrocks (1966) TV Series (writer)
The Old Wives' Table (1964) (TV)
Suspense (1962) TV Series (writer)
Persuasion (1960) (mini) TV Series
Barnaby Rudge (1960) TV Series (writer)
Hilda Lessways (1959) (TV) (adaptation)
The Royalty (1957) TV Series (writer)
"The Present", an episode of Douglas Fairbanks, Jr., Presents (1956)

References

External links 
 

1920 births
1987 deaths
British television writers
20th-century screenwriters